The  Caçador Grande River is a river of Santa Catarina state in southeastern Brazil. It is part of the Paraná River basin and a tributary of the Timbó River.

See also
List of rivers of Santa Catarina

References
 Map from Ministry of Transport

Rivers of Santa Catarina (state)